is a Japanese professional shogi player, ranked 6-dan.

Promotion history
Sakaguchi's promotion history is as follows:
 6-kyū: 1991
 1-dan: 1996
 4-dan: October 1, 2004
 5-dan: December 8, 2009
 6-dan: July 19, 2018

References

External links
ShogiHub: Professional Player Info · Sakaguchi, Satoru

Japanese shogi players
Living people
Professional shogi players
Professional shogi players from Osaka Prefecture
1978 births
People from Takaishi, Osaka